Manduca morelia is a moth of the family Sphingidae first described by Herbert Druce in 1884. It is known from Mexico.

References

Manduca
Moths described in 1884